Beattystown is an unincorporated community and census-designated place (CDP) located within Mansfield Township, in Warren County, New Jersey, United States. As of the 2010 United States Census, the CDP's population was 4,554.

Beattystown has been listed as one of the 10 most endangered historic sites in New Jersey by Preservation New Jersey.

Beattystown was named after George Beatty, who built a mill here .

Geography
According to the United States Census Bureau, Beattystown had a total area of 3.036 square miles (7.863 km2), including 3.011 square miles (7.799 km2) of land and 0.025 square miles (0.064 km2) of water (0.81%).

Demographics

Census 2010

Census 2000
As of the 2000 United States Census there were 3,223 people, 1,218 households, and 862 families residing in the CDP. The population density was 413.4/km2 (1,071.5/mi2). There were 1,253 housing units at an average density of 160.7/km2 (416.6/mi2). The racial makeup of the CDP was 91.75% White, 1.64% African American, 0.03% Native American, 1.86% Asian, 2.64% from other races, and 2.08% from two or more races. Hispanic or Latino of any race were 6.52% of the population.

There were 1,218 households, out of which 39.5% had children under the age of 18 living with them, 56.3% were married couples living together, 10.3% had a female householder with no husband present, and 29.2% were non-families. 22.6% of all households were made up of individuals, and 6.2% had someone living alone who was 65 years of age or older. The average household size was 2.65 and the average family size was 3.16.

In the CDP the population was spread out, with 28.4% under the age of 18, 6.1% from 18 to 24, 36.9% from 25 to 44, 21.1% from 45 to 64, and 7.5% who were 65 years of age or older. The median age was 35 years. For every 100 females, there were 96.3 males. For every 100 females age 18 and over, there were 90.5 males.

The median income for a household in the CDP was $56,507, and the median income for a family was $75,196. Males had a median income of $48,843 versus $38,173 for females. The per capita income for the CDP was $29,345. About 2.0% of families and 2.3% of the population were below the poverty line, including 1.1% of those under age 18 and none of those age 65 or over.

Points of interest

The Beattystown Historic District was added to the National Register of Historic Places on September 28, 1990 for its significance in architecture, commerce, industry, and settlement pattern.

References

Census-designated places in Warren County, New Jersey
Mansfield Township, Warren County, New Jersey